

Lists of notable fights and other key news by year

2000
February 19 Erik Morales defeats Marco Antonio Barrera to unify the WBO and WBC super bantamweight belts. Was named fight of the year by Ring Magazine 
March 3 Félix Trinidad defeats David Reid by unanimous decision for the WBA light middleweight title.
April 8 Uriah Grant knocked out Thomas Hearns in the third round to win the IBO Cruiserweight championship. Hearns would never again be boxing for a world title; he retired in 2006.
April 15 Fernando Vargas successfully defends the IBF light middleweight title against former WBA welterweight champion Ike Quartey 
April 1 Chris Byrd wins heavyweight title from Vitali Klitschko. 
April 29 Lennox Lewis defends the IBF and WBC Heavyweight titles via 2nd-round KO against Michael Grant
June 17 Sugar Shane Mosley defeats Oscar De La Hoya by split decision for the WBC welterweight title.
July 15 Lennox Lewis defeat Frans Botha via 2nd-round KO to retained his WBC, IBF, IBO, Lineal Heavyweight Championship
August 12 Evander Holyfield defeats John Ruiz by unanimous decision for the WBA Heavyweight title making Holyfield the only heavyweight in boxing history to win a portion of the HW title 4 times.
September 2 Erik Morales defeats Kevin Kelley by 7th-round KO to win the Interim WBC Featherweight Championship
Diego Corrales defeats Angel Manfredy by 3rd-round TKO to retained his IBF & IBA Super Featherweight Championship
September 9 Roy Jones Jr. defeats Eric Harding by 10th-round TKO to retained his WBC, WBA, IBF, and won the IBO Light Heavyweight Championship
November 11 Lennox Lewis defends the WBC and IBF Heavyweight titles in a lopsided unanimous decision against David Tua.
December 1 Bernard Hopkins defeats Antwun Echols by 10th-round TKO to retained his IBF Middleweight Championship
December 2 Félix Trinidad defeats Fernando Vargas by 12th-round KO to unify the WBA and IBF light middleweight titles.  Trinidad was knocked down early in the fourth round to come back and defeat Vargas.

2001
January 20 Floyd Mayweather Jr. dominates Diego Corrales to successfully defend his WBC Super Featherweight title. Corrales was knocked down five times, before his corner threw the towel in the tenth round.
March 3 John Ruiz defeats Evander Holyfield by unanimous decision to win the WBA Heavyweight championship. Ruiz, an American of Puerto Rican descent, becomes the first Hispanic world heavyweight champion.
March 24 Oscar De La Hoya wins decisively against Arturo Gatti by knockout in five rounds in a non-title match.  
April 7 After a fourteen-minute introduction, Naseem Hamed loses to Marco Antonio Barrera by unanimous decision.  Barrera, then known as a brawler, surprisingly easily out-boxed Hamed, who later retired after his next bout.
April 22 Hasim Rahman defeats Lennox Lewis via 5th-round KO in South Africa and loses the WBC and IBF heavyweight titles.  Rahman lands a hard right hand for the upset knockout.
May 12 Félix Trinidad beats William Joppy, by knockout in 5, to take the WBA middleweight title.
June 23 Oscar De La Hoya captures the WBC Light Middleweight title by unanimous decision against Javier Castillejo.
July 13 Micky Ward defeats Emanuel Augustus by 10-round decision and is named fight of the year by Ring Magazine
July 28 Roy Jones Jr. defends the WBC, WBA, and IBF light heavyweight titles against Julio César González by unanimous decision. 
September 29 In a career defining performance, Bernard Hopkins defeats Félix Trinidad by technical knockout in 12, to successfully unify the WBA, WBC, and IBF titles to become the Undisputed Middleweight Champion.
November 3 Kostya Tszyu becomes the undisputed champion of the Light Welterweight division as he defeats Zab Judah by a dramatic second-round knockout in Las Vegas, Nevada. Judah was later suspended for 6 months and fined by the Nevada State Athletic Commission for attacking referee Jay Nady and hurling his stool toward the center of the ring after the fight was stopped.
November 17 Lennox Lewis recaptures the heavyweight title as he avenges his loss against Hasim Rahman by fourth-round knockout.
December 15 John Ruiz and Evander Holyfield fought to a draw for the WBA Heavyweight Championship

2002
January 26 Vernon Forrest upsets Shane Mosley by unanimous decision, to capture the WBC Welterweight title.
February 2 In his first fight after becoming Undisputed Middleweight Champion, Bernard Hopkins defends the WBA, WBC, and IBF titles against Carl Daniels.
March 30 In a rematch, Ricardo Mayorga defeats Andrew "six heads" Lewis by 5th-round TKO to capture the WBA welterweight title.
April 20 Floyd Mayweather Jr. moves to lightweight and wins by controversial unanimous decision against José Luis Castillo to take the WBC Lightweight title.
May 18 Micky Ward defeats Arturo Gatti in a very competitive non-title light welterweight bout.  After getting knocked down in the ninth round Gatti came back and traded power punches with Ward.  The fight was later named the 2002 Ring Magazine fight of the year.
June 1 Evander Holyfield defeats Hasim Rahman by technical decision in eight rounds.  A welt the size of a golf ball formed on Rahman's head leading the referee to stop the fight.
June 8 Lennox Lewis defeats Mike Tyson by eighth-round knockout. The fight is overshadowed by its prefight melee, in which Tyson rushed Lewis and started a brawl. 
June 22 In their rematch, Marco Antonio Barrera defeats Erik Morales by unanimous decision to take the WBC featherweight title.
July 20 Vernon Forrest defeats Shane Mosley in their rematch by unanimous decision, in Indianapolis to defend the WBC Welterweight title.
September 14 Oscar De La Hoya defeats Fernando Vargas by 11th-round TKO to unify the WBC and WBA light middleweight belts.
November 23 Arturo Gatti defeats Mickey Ward by unanimous decision in their second fight
December 7 Floyd Mayweather Jr. defends his WBC lightweight title as he defeats José Luis Castillo in their rematch.

2003
January 25 Ricardo Mayorga knocks out Vernon Forrest by 3rd-round knockout, to unify the WBC and WBA Welterweight titles. 
 March 1 Roy Jones Jr. defeats John Ruiz by unanimous decision to win the WBA Heavyweight Championship
June 21 Lennox Lewis defends his title as he defeats Vitali Klitschko by technical knockout in 6 due to a cut in Klitschko's left eye.  Klitschko was up on all of the scorecards at the time of the stoppage.  There is talk of a rematch, but Lewis instead retires.
July 12 Ricardo Mayorga successfully defends his WBA and WBC welterweight belts as he defeats Vernon Forrest by controversial majority decision.
July 17 Jeff Lacy (as an up-and-coming super middleweight) defeats Richard Grant to win the vacant NABA Super Middleweight title as well as the USBA and  WBC Continental Americas Super Middleweight titles.
September 13 Shane Mosley defeats Oscar De La Hoya in their rematch to unify the WBC and WBA light middleweight title belts.
November 8 Roy Jones Jr. defeats Antonio Tarver by controversial majority decision to recapture the light heavyweight title. Many thought this was Jones's first real challenge in his career.
November 15 Manny Pacquiao upsets Marco Antonio Barrera by eleventh-round technical knockout to earn the Ring Magazine featherweight title.
December 13 Cory Spinks becomes the Undisputed Welterweight Champion after he defeats Ricardo Mayorga by majority decision.

2004
 January 17- Zsolt Erdei defeats Julio César González to become the WBO Light Heavyweight 
March 13- Winky Wright becomes the Undisputed Light Middleweight Champion after defeating Shane Mosley by unanimous decision.
April 10- Cory Spinks defends his undisputed welterweight title as he defeats Zab Judah by unanimous decision.
May 8- Manny Pacquiao and Juan Manuel Márquez fought for the Featherweight championship. Although he was knocked down 3 times in the 1st round, Márquez managed to control the succeeding rounds to earn a somewhat controversial draw. Márquez retained his WBA and IBF titles, while Pacquiao retained his Ring Magazine title.
May 15- Antonio Tarver upsets Roy Jones Jr., knocking him out in the second round to take the WBC, WBA and WBO light heavyweight titles.  
September 18- Bernard Hopkins adds the WBO title to his undisputed middleweight status as he defeats Oscar De La Hoya by a bodyshot knockout in the ninth round. This is Oscar De La Hoya's only defeat by knockout, and the last knockout victory Hopkins achieved (All of Hopkins' victories since then have been by decision).
September 25- Roy Jones Jr. gets knocked out for the second consecutive fight as he loses to Glen Johnson for the IBF light heavyweight title.
November 20- Winky Wright beats Shane Mosley in their rematch to defend the light middleweight title.
December 18- Glen Johnson beats Antonio Tarver by split decision.

2005
February 5 Zab Judah knocks out Cory Spinks in nine rounds in Spinks's hometown, St. Louis, Missouri. Judah becomes the new Undisputed Welterweight Champion.  Spinks had a dramatic ring entrance with rapper Nelly.
March 19 Erik Morales defeats Manny Pacquiao by unanimous decision.
May 7 Diego Corrales defeats José Luis Castillo by 10th-round knockout for the WBO-WBC lightweight title unification.  Both men were exchanging brutal punishment throughout the fight, before a dramatic tenth round in which Corrales scored a TKO after getting knocked down twice. It won Fight of the Year.
May 14 Winky Wright beats Félix Trinidad by unanimous decision.
June 4 Ricky Hatton defeats The Ring champion and universally acknowledged #1 Light-Welterweight Kostya Tszyu by 11th-round TKO for the IBF Light-Welterweight title. After a highly physical battle, Tszyu was unable to come out for the twelfth round.
June 18 Antonio Tarver defeats Glen Johnson by unanimous decision in their rematch.
June 25 Floyd Mayweather Jr. comprehensively defeats Arturo Gatti by six-round technical knockout to capture the WBC Light Welterweight title.
July 16 Bernard Hopkins loses a split decision against Jermain Taylor, who becomes the new Undisputed Middleweight Champion of the World.
October 1 Antonio Tarver again beats Roy Jones Jr., this time by unanimous decision.
December 3 Jermain Taylor retains the middleweight title as he defeats Bernard Hopkins by unanimous  decision.
December 17 Nikolay Valuev defeats John Ruiz to win the WBA World Heavyweight Title for the first time.

2006
January 7 Carlos Baldomir upsets Zab Judah to win the WBC welterweight title, as well as being the recognized welterweight champion, as Judah was the undisputed champion at the time of the bout.
January 7 On the undercard of the Baldomir/Judah bout, O'Neil Bell becomes the second undisputed Cruiserweight Champion, as he defeats Frenchman Jean-Marc Mormeck by knockout in the 10th.
January 21 Manny Pacquiao exacts his revenge on Erik Morales by stopping him in the 10th round.
February 25 Shane Mosley TKOs Fernando Vargas.
March 3 Joe Calzaghe defeats Jeff Lacy by lopsided unanimous decision for the IBF-WBO super middleweight unification.
March 18 James Toney fights Hasim Rahman for the WBC Heavyweight title; the fight ends in a draw.
April 1 Sergei Liakhovich wins the WBO heavyweight title from Lamon Brewster by unanimous decision.
April 8 Floyd Mayweather Jr. defeats Zab Judah by unanimous decision to win the IBF welterweight title.  A mini-riot ensues as Roger Mayweather, Floyd's uncle and trainer, runs into the ring, retaliating to a low blow and rabbit punch by Judah.
April 22 Wladimir Klitschko wins the IBF world heavyweight title from Chris Byrd by TKO in round 7.
May 6 Oscar De La Hoya returns from a 20-month break and defeats Ricardo Mayorga for the WBC super welterweight title.
May 11 Former two-time heavyweight champion Floyd Patterson dies from complications of Alzheimer’s disease and prostate cancer.
May 20 Marco Antonio Barrera defeats Rocky Juarez by split decision.  Juarez was competitive throughout the fight, breaking Barrera's nose in the early rounds.  The fight was originally announced as a draw, until it was later revealed that there were two scorecard tabulation errors.
June 10 Bernard Hopkins defeats Antonio Tarver by unanimous decision to take the light heavyweight world championship.
June 17 – Winky Wright and Jermain Taylor fight ends in a draw for the undisputed middleweight championship of the world in Memphis, Tennessee
July 22 Carlos Baldomir defends his welterweight title as he defeats Arturo Gatti by 9th-round knockout.
August 5 Edwin Valero  wins the WBA super featherweight title by defeating Vicente Mosquera by 10th-round TKO in Mosquera's home country, Panama.
August 12 Oleg Maskaev knocks out Hasim Rahman in the 12th round to win the WBC Heavyweight title.
September 16 Marco Antonio Barrera defeats Rocky Juarez in the rematch and successfully defends his WBC super featherweight title.
October 14 Mikkel Kessler unifies the WBC and WBA Super middleweight titles after knocking out Markus Beyer in three rounds.
November 4 Floyd Mayweather Jr. becomes the WBC and linear Welterweight champion after he defeats Carlos Baldomir by unanimous decision.
November 11 Wladimir Klitschko defends his IBF heavyweight title by defeating American contender Calvin Brock by a stunning knockout in the 7th round.
November 18 Manny Pacquiao knocks out Erik Morales in the 3rd round of their third and final match.

2007 
 January 6 Sam Peter defeats James Toney by unanimous decision in their rematch.  Peter becomes the #1 challenger for WBC Heavyweight champion Oleg Maskaev.
 January 20 Nikolay Valuev defends his WBA Heavyweight title by defeating Jameel McCline by technical knockout after McCline blew out his knee.
January 20 Ricky Hatton beats Juan Urango by unanimous decision.  Both fighters were previously unbeaten.
 February 3  Chad Dawson becomes WBC Light Heavyweight champion after defeating Tomasz Adamek by unanimous decision.  Despite being knocked down from a straight right hand in round 10, Dawson dominates most of the fight with his speed.
 February 10 Shane Mosley becomes WBC Welterweight champion by defeating Luis Collazo by unanimous decision.
 March 3 Rafael Márquez moves up in weight class and defeats Ring Magazine and WBC Super Bantamweight champion Israel Vázquez by 7th-round technical knockout.  Vazquez did not answer the bell after badly breaking his nose and having trouble breathing.
 March 10 Wladimir Klitschko defends his IBF Heavyweight title by defeating Ray Austin by 2nd-round knockout.
 March 17 Juan Manuel Márquez defeats Marco Antonio Barrera by unanimous decision to become the WBC Super Featherweight champion.  In the seventh round there was controversy, as Marquez thoroughly dominated the round then got knocked down by Barrera. Referee Jay Nady ruled this a slip, then penalized Barrera for hitting while Marquez was on the canvas.
 March 24 Mikkel Kessler defends his WBA and WBC Super middleweight titles bt defeating Librado Andrade by a shutout unanimous decision.
 April 7 Joe Calzaghe defends his WBO and Ring Magazine super middleweight titles by defeating Peter Manfredo (of The Contender fame) by a 3rd-round technical knockout.
 April HBO airs De la Hoya/Mayweather 24/7 for three weeks to hype the highly anticipated matchup between Oscar De La Hoya and Floyd Mayweather Jr.
 April 14 Ruslan Chagaev becomes the new WBA Heavyweight Champion after defeating Nicolay Valuev by majority decision.
 April 28 Juan Díaz unifies the WBA and WBO Lightweight titles after defeating Acelino Freitas. Freitas refused to answer the bell before round nine.
 May 5 In a highly anticipated matchup, Floyd Mayweather Jr. defeats Oscar De La Hoya by split decision, taking the WBC junior middleweight title.   Despite being one of the richest fights in the history of the sport, the fight generally did not match the hype.
 May 7 Former super featherweight and lightweight champion Diego Corrales dies in a motorcycle accident near his home in Las Vegas.  Corrales died on the two-year anniversary of his thrilling first fight against José Luis Castillo, regarded as one of the greatest fights in modern history. 
 June 2 Sultan Ibragimov defeats Shannon Briggs by unanimous decision to take the WBO heavyweight title.
 June 9 Miguel Cotto successfully defends his WBA Welterweight title as he defeats Zab Judah by technical knockout in the 11th.
 June 23 Ricky Hatton defends his Ring light welterweight crown as he defeats José Luis Castillo by knockout.  Hatton hits him with a perfect liver punch, putting him on the canvas for the first time in his pro career.
 July 7 Vic Darchinyan loses his IBF and IBO flyweight titles, getting knocked out by Nonito Donaire in five rounds.
 July 14 Paul Williams becomes the WBO welterweight champion as he defeats Antonio Margarito by unanimous decision.
 July 18 Daisuke Naito upsets Pongsaklek Wonjongkam, who had previously beaten him twice, by unanimous decision. Naito ends Wonjongkam's six-year run as WBC flyweight champion.
 July 21 Bernard Hopkins beats Winky Wright by unanimous decision.
 August 4 Israel Vázquez defeats Rafael Márquez by technical knockout in the 6th round of their rematch to recapture the WBC super bantamweight title.  The two traded punches throughout the fight before Vázquez dominated Márquez in the sixth round, causing the referee to stop the fight.
 August 25 Iván Calderón defeats Hugo Fidel Cazares in a split decision to win the WBO Light Flyweight title and to become The Ring Magazine Jr. Flyweight champion. This was Calderon's first fight at Light Flyweight.
 September 29 Kelly Pavlik upsets Jermain Taylor by seventh-round TKO to win the WBC, WBO and universally recognized middleweight championship. Pavlik was knocked down in the second round but rallied back against a tired Taylor.
 October 6 Manny Pacquiao defeats Marco Antonio Barrera by unanimous decision.  Barrera would announce his retirement after the fight.
 October 13-Sultan Ibragimov defeats Evander Holyfield by 12-round Unanimous Decision and retains title of WBO World Heavyweight Champion.
 November 4 Joe Calzaghe defeats Mikkel Kessler by unanimous decision in a unification bout for the WBA, WBC and WBO super middleweight titles. Calzaghe becomes the first undisputed super middleweight champion and surpasses the 20 defenses made by Bernard Hopkins and Larry Holmes at middleweight and heavyweight respectively.
 November 11 David Haye beats Jean Marc Mormeck by a 7th-round TKO to win the WBC cruiserweight title and the WBA super cruiserweight title.
 December 8 Floyd Mayweather Jr. defends his WBC and Ring Welterweight titles, defeating Ricky Hatton by 10th-round technical knockout.
 December 16 Danny Green defeats Stipe Drews to win the WBA Light Heavyweight title. This is Green's first successful world title match after trying to win the WBC Super Middleweight Title twice.

2008 
 January 19 Ruslan Chagaev defends his WBA Heavyweight title, defeating Matt Skelton by unanimous decision. 
 January 19 Roy Jones Jr. defeats Félix Trinidad by unanimous decision.  In his first fight in two years and second in five, Trinidad was down twice.
 February 16 Kelly Pavlik defeats Jermain Taylor by unanimous decision in a rematch of their 2007 encounter.
 February 23 Wladimir Klitschko unifies the IBF and WBO heavyweight titles as he defeats Sultan Ibragimov by unanimous decision in Madison Square Garden.
 March 1 Israel Vázquez successfully defends the WBC and Ring Magazine titles as he defeats Rafael Márquez by split decision.
 March 8 David Haye unifies the WBA, WBC and WBO titles as he defeats Enzo Maccarinelli by a 2nd-round technical knockout.
 March 8 Nate Campbell upsets Juan Díaz by split decision. Campbell becomes the unified WBA, IBF and WBO champion.
 March 8 Sam Peter wins the WBC Heavyweight title as he defeats Oleg Maskaev by 6th-round TKO.
 March 15 Manny Pacquiao becomes the Ring Magazine and WBC super featherweight champion as he defeats Juan Manuel Márquez by split decision.
 March 22 Joel Casamayor defeats Michael Katsidis by 10th-round technical knockout to defend the Ring Magazine Lightweight championship. In a thrilling back-and-forth fight, Casamayor knocked down Katsidis twice in the opening round, only to have Katsidis come back with a knockdown in the 6th. Casamayor knocked Katsidis down again in the 10th, hurting him in the process, and the referee called a halt to the contest.
 April 12 Chad Dawson defeats Glen Johnson by a close unanimous decision and retains his WBC Light Heavyweight title.
 April 12 Antonio Tarver gains the IBF Light Heavyweight title as he defeats Clinton Woods by unanimous decision.
 April 12 Antonio Margarito knocks out Kermit Cintron in the 6th round to gain the IBF Welterweight title.
 April 12 Miguel Cotto defeats former Contender star Alfonso Gomez to retain the WBA Welterweight title. The fight doctor put a halt on the contest before the start of the 6th round.
 April 19 Joe Calzaghe defeats Bernard Hopkins in Las Vegas by split decision to gain the Ring Light Heavyweight championship.
 June 28 Manny Pacquiao defeats David Díaz via 9th-round knockout to take the WBC lightweight crown, his fifth world title in five weight divisions.
 July 26 Antonio Margarito knocks out Miguel Cotto in the 11th to gain the WBA Welterweight title. Cotto managed to control the early rounds, but Margarito came back with relentless pressure, eventually winning one of the greatest fights of the year.  But the handwrap controversy surrounding Margarito was later to call the victory's validity into question.
 September 13 Juan Manuel Márquez defeats Joel Casamayor by stopping him in the 11th round after two knockdowns to capture the Ring Magazine Lightweight title.
 September 15 Roman Gonzalez knocks out Yutaka Niida to become the WBA minimumweight champion.
 October 11 In his first fight in four years, Vitali Klitschko dominates Sam Peter, who had previously given trouble to Wladimir Klitschko.
 October 18 Bernard Hopkins beats undefeated Kelly Pavlik via unanimous decision. Despite being 17 years older than Pavlik, Hopkins outworked and outhustled him throughout the fight.
 November 8 Joe Calzaghe defeats Roy Jones Jr. in New York City by unanimous decision to retain the Ring Magazine Light Heavyweight title. Despite being put down in the 1st round, Calzaghe controlled the succeeding rounds to win the decision.
 November 22 Ricky Hatton stops Paul Malignaggi in the 11th round to retain the Ring Magazine Light Welterweight title.
 December 6 Manny Pacquiao defeats Oscar De La Hoya after eight rounds in a fight billed as "The Dream Match." When De La Hoya couldn't answer the bell for the ninth round, it was officially a technical knockout.
 December 6 Carl Froch defeats Jean Pascal by decision to become the WBC Super Middleweight Champion.
 December 13 Wladimir Klitschko beats Hasim Rahman by 7th-round TKO.

2009 
 January 24 Shane Mosley defeats Antonio Margarito to win the WBA welterweight title by 9th-round TKO. Controversy erupted before the fight when it was discovered that Margarito had an illegal plaster-like substance in his gloves. Margarito and his trainer had their boxing licenses revoked.
30 January Former heavyweight champion 1959-1960 Ingemar Johansson dies from complications of pneumonia and had suffered from Alzheimer’s disease.
 February 5: Joe Calzaghe retires unbeaten in 46 bouts as a two weight champion
 February 21 Kelly Pavlik beat Marco Antonio Rubio by stoppage in the 9th round. This was Pavlik's second defense of his Ring, WBC, and WBO middleweight titles.
 February 28 Juan Manuel Márquez defeats Juan Díaz via 9th-round TKO to bag the WBA and WBO lightweight titles. The 14,571 spectators in attendance at the Toyota Center was the largest in Texas boxing history. This fight was later named the fight of the year.
 February 28 Román González beats Francisco Rosas to get the WBA minimumweight title for the second time.
 March 14 Amir Khan defeats Marco Antonio Barrera after the fight was stopped toward the end of the 5th round. Barrera suffering a severe cut, reopened from his previous fight, by a clash of heads late in the opening round. With Barrera deemed in no position to fight on by the ringside doctor, the fight went to the scorecards where Khan was ahead on all three.
 March 21 Roy Jones Jr. knocks out Omar Sheika in the 5th round to win the vacant NABO light heavyweight title. This was Jones' first knockout win in 6½ years. The undercard featured MMA fights.
 April 25 Carl Froch beats Jermain Taylor via 12th-round TKO. This was Froch's first defense of his WBC super middleweight title. Froch was knocked down in the 3rd round, and Taylor was knocked down in the 12th.
 May 2 Manny Pacquiao stops Ricky Hatton after two brutal rounds in a fight billed as "The Battle of East and West" in Las Vegas. During the 1st round, Pacquiao knocked down Hatton twice. In the 2nd round, Pacquiao continued to rain Hatton with furious combinations, eventually knocking him out with a thunderous left hook. For his win, Pacquiao took the IBO and The Ring light welterweight titles. The fight was named the knockout of the year.
 May 9 Chad Dawson defeats Antonio Tarver by decision. This was Dawson's first defense of his IBF and IBO light heavyweight titles.
 June 20 Wladimir Klitschko beat Ruslan Chagaev by RTD in the 9th round. The fight was Klitschko's seventh defense of his IBO and IBF heavyweight titles and his third defense of his WBO heavyweight title. Klitschko also won the vacant Ring heavyweight title and the vacant lineal title. The crowd of 61,000 was the biggest boxing audience in Germany since Max Schmeling knocked out Adolf Heuser in front of 70,000 in Stuttgart in 1939.
 August 15 Roy Jones Jr. stops Jeff Lacy in the 10th round. This was Jones' first defense of his NABO light heavyweight title. The fight was entitled "Hook City". 
 September 12 Iván Calderón defeats Rodel Mayol to defend his WBO light flyweight title for the fifth time. The two had previously fought to a draw.
 September 19 Floyd Mayweather Jr. dominates Juan Manuel Márquez in Mayweather's comeback fight, after retiring 21 months earlier. There was some controversy over Mayweather being two pounds over the  weight limit, for which he later paid Marquez $600,000. The fight was aired the same night that UFC 103 was aired, however sold much better, with 600,000 more PPV buys.
 September 19 Chris John defeats Rocky Juarez by decision after fighting Juarez to a draw earlier in the year. The fight was part of the undercard of Floyd Mayweather vs. Juan Manuel Marquez, and some journalists had thought it might turn out a better fight than the main event.
 September 26 Vitali Klitschko knocks out undefeated Chris Arreola in the 10th round. The fight was Klitschko's fourth defense of his WBC heavyweight title.
 October 10 Juan Manuel López beats Rogers Mtagwa by decision to defend his WBO Super Bantamweight title for the fourth time.
 October 10 Juan Carlos Salgado knocks out Jorge Linares in the 1st round. The fight was named the upset of the year.
 October 17 Arthur Abraham knocks out Jermain Taylor with less than 10 seconds left in the fight as part of the Super Six Tournament.
 October 18 Carl Froch beats Andre Dirrell by split decision as part of the Super Six Tournament.
 October 24 Tomasz Adamek beats Andrew Golota for the IBF International Heavyweight Title. This is Adamek's debut as a heavyweight.
 November 7 David Haye beats Nikolai Valuev by points to become the WBA Heavyweight Champion.
 November 7 Chad Dawson defeats Glen Johnson in a rematch to win the WBC Light Heavyweight titled and retain the IBO Light Heavyweight title.
 November 14 Manny Pacquiao defeats Miguel Cotto by a technical knockout with 2:05 left in the fight to become the only boxer to win a world title in seven different weight divisions. As well as to win Cotto's WBO welterweight title and the inaugural WBC Diamond Belt.
 November 14 Yuri Foreman defeats Daniel Santos by unanimous decision to win the WBA Super welterweight champion and become the first Israeli boxer to win a world title.
 November 21 Andre Ward upsets Mikkel Kessler as part of the Super Six Tournament to become the WBA Super Middleweight Champion.
 November 28 Lucian Bute knocks out Librado Andrade at the end of the fourth round as part of a rematch between the two fighters.
 December 2 Danny Green knocks out Roy Jones Jr. in a shocking 2:02 KO after Green landed two solid left hands and a right cross to the temple that knocked Jones out.
 December 2 Bernard Hopkins, at nearly 45 years old, beats Enrique Ornelas by decision.
 December 5 Amir Khan stops Dmitriy Salita in a seventy-six second TKO. The first knockdown came only ten seconds after the fight began. This is Salita's first career loss.

References

 2000s
2000s in sports